New Erection is an unincorporated community located in Rockingham County, in the U.S. state of Virginia.

The community took its name from a Presbyterian church called "New Erection" because it was re-erected there, having previously been erected in Dayton.

References

Unincorporated communities in Rockingham County, Virginia
Unincorporated communities in Virginia